Tietäjän laulu is the second full-length album by Russian post-rock band Kauan, released on BadMoodMan Music in 2008.

Track listing
"Vmesto slez" - 6:37
"Kyynelten sijaan" - 09:25
"Pesnja materi" - 06:01
"Äidin laulu" - 12:02
"Prozrachni cvetok" - 8:12
"Orkidea" - 10:34

Personnel
Anton Belov - guitar, vocals, keyboards, programming
Lubov Mushnikova – violin
Mihail Korotkov - bagpipes    
Artur Andriasän - keyboards     
Tyurgan Kam - tambourine, vocals
Katerina Ershova - vocals

References

2011 albums
Kauan albums